Nationality words link to articles with information on the nation's poetry or literature (for instance, Irish or France).

Events

Works published
 Matsuo Bashō, Oku no Hosomichi (奥の細道, "The Narrow Road to the Interior" or "The Narrow Road to the Deep North") is published posthumously. This poetic travel diary chronicles a journey to the Northern Provinces of Honshū undertaken in 1689.
 Edward Bysshe, The Art of English Poetry (criticism)
 Daniel Defoe:
 The Mock-Mourners: A satyr, by way of an elegy on King William
 Reformation of Manners: A satyr, published anonymously
 The Spanish Descent
 John Dennis, The Monument, a memorial poem on the death of William III on March 8
 George Farquhar, Love and Business, verse and prose
 William King - De Origine Mali (in Latin)
 Mary Mollineux, Fruits of Retirement; or, Miscellaneous Poems, Moral and Divine
 Nicholas Noyes, "A Prefatory Poem", the preface for Cotton Mather's Magnalia Christi Americana, English Colonial America
 John Pomfret, Miscellany Poems on Several Occasions
 Sir Charles Sedley, Miscellaneous Works (posthumous)
 Joseph Stennett, A Poem to the Memory of His Late Majesty William the Third

Births
Death years link to the corresponding "[year] in poetry" article:
 June 26 – Philip Doddridge (died 1751), English Nonconformist preacher and writer
 August 26 – Judith Madan, née Cowper (died 1781), English poet
 October 24 – Yokoi Yayū 横井 也有, born , taking pseudonym Tatsunojō (died 1783), Japanese samurai, scholar of Kokugaku and haikai poet
 Also – Kenrick Prescot (died 1779), English poet
 Approximate date
 David Mallet (died 1765), Scottish poet and dramatist
 Francis Williams (died 1770), black Jamaican scholar and poet
 Antonina Niemiryczowa  (died 1780), Polish poet

Deaths
Birth years link to the corresponding "[year] in poetry" article:
 May 26 – Zeb-un-Nissa (Makhfi) (born 1638), Persian poet and Mughal princess
 Late November – John Pomfret (born 1667), English poet and clergyman
 December 18 (bur.) – Laurens Bake (born 1629), Dutch poet

See also

 Poetry
 List of years in poetry
 18th century in poetry
 18th century in literature
 Augustan poetry

Notes

18th-century poetry
Poetry